Freedumb is a studio album by American crossover band Suicidal Tendencies. It was released in 1999 on Suicidal Records.

The tracks are rawer than the funk-influenced thrash metal direction they were taking before the hiatus. The album's cover art is a reference to the photo Raising the Flag on Iwo Jima taken during World War II.

Reception
CMJ New Music Report wrote that the songs "display thousand-mile-an-hour, classic hardcore guitar assaults." In 2005, Freedumb was ranked number 489 in Rock Hard magazine's book of The 500 Greatest Rock & Metal Albums of All Time.

Track listing

Credits
Mike Muir – vocals
Dean Pleasants – lead guitar
Mike Clark – rhythm guitar
Brooks Wackerman – drums
Josh Paul – bass (credited as "additional musician")

Tracks 1, 2, 5–10, 12, 13 
 Recorded at Ocean Studios and Skip Saylor Studios
 Produced by Paul Northfield and Suicidal Tendencies
 Engineered and mixed by Paul Northfield

Tracks 3, 4, 11, 14 
 Recorded at Titan Studios, except track 11 guitars at Skip Saylor
 Produced by Suicidal Tendencies
 Engineered by Michael Vail Blum
 Mixed by Paul Northfield at Skip Saylor Studios
 Mastered by Brian Gardner at Bernie Grundman Mastering Studios

References

External links
Suicidal Tendencies official website

Suicidal Tendencies albums
1999 albums
SideOneDummy Records albums
Albums produced by Paul Northfield